Abraham Storck (or Sturckenburch) (bapt. 17 April 1644 in Amsterdam – buried 8 April 1708), was a Dutch painter, who enjoyed a reputation for his marine paintings, topographical views and Italianate harbour scenes. Storck was also an outstanding draughtsman.

Life
Storck was baptized in the Noorderkerk, a Protestant church in the Jordaan. His father was the painter Jan Jansz Sturck (or Johannes Storck)  (1603-1673), from Wesel; his mother was Teuntje (Apolonia) Jacobs. The couple married in 1628. Storck had two brothers, who were also painters using the name Sturckenburch until c. 1688 after which they started calling themselves Storck or Sturck.  It is likely they were all trained with their father in the family workshop and joined the local Guild of Saint Luke, otherwise it was impossible to sell any painting.

Circa 1666 Storck established his workshop producing naval, harbor scenes as well as landscape paintings  and city scapes. In 1670 he traveled with his brother Jacob and worked in Germany. In 1694, at age 49, he married the widow Neeltje Pieters van Meyservelt. At the end of his life he lived on Kattenburg near the harbour.

Work

Storck's marine and river scenes were influenced by the two Willem van de Veldes (the elder and the younger), Ludolf Bakhuizen and by Jan Abrahamsz Beerstraaten.

Storck, influenced by Jan Baptist Weenix, produced fantastical views of Mediterranean ports, which place merchant shipping a midst architectural ruins, depicted in the crystal-clear colours of Italian art of the period. This type of scene anticipated the popular 18th-century Italian capriccio. He depicted ships' rigging and technical details with considerable accuracy, which likely shows the influence of the van de Veldes. His Dutch harbour and river views often include recreational and ceremonial aspects of shipping. He paid particular attention to the display of pleasure yachts, ceremonial gatherings of ships, the passengers and bystanders.

Storck painted some winter scenes, which are inspired by the example of Jan Abrahamsz Beerstraaten and his son Abraham Beerstraaten, a selfportrait, and some allegories.

Notes

External links

Dutch Golden Age painters
Dutch male painters
1644 births
1708 deaths
Painters from Amsterdam
Dutch marine artists